Gabriel Ntisezerana is a Burundian politician who was Vice-President of Burundi from February 2007 to August 2010. Subsequently, he was President of the Senate of Burundi from August 2010 to August 2015. He is also a trained economist and banker. He previously served as governor of the central bank, Bank of the Republic of Burundi, from 2006 to 2007.

References

Year of birth missing (living people)
Living people
Hutu people
Burundian economists
Vice-presidents of Burundi
Governors of Bank of the Republic of Burundi
Presidents of the Senate (Burundi)
National Council for the Defense of Democracy – Forces for the Defense of Democracy politicians